The Believers Broadcasting Corporation is a Christian media company located in downtown Quincy, Illinois at 220 North Sixth Street.

Believers' sole broadcasting property is KJIR 91.7 FM, a station that broadcasts a Southern Gospel format, with educational and worship programs.

Believers previously owned television stations WTJR in Quincy and WEIL-LP (now WLCF-LD) in Decatur; these stations would be acquired by the Christian Television Network in June 2006 and February 2008, respectively.

Christian mass media companies
Radio broadcasting companies of the United States
Quincy–Hannibal area
Companies based in Adams County, Illinois